Schomberg (Sloan Field) Aerodrome  is located  west southwest of Schomberg, Ontario, Canada.

References

Registered aerodromes in Ontario